Disher is a surname. Notable people with the name include:

 Catherine Disher (born 1960), Canadian actress and voice actress
 Eve Disher (1894–1991), British artist
 Garry Disher (born 1949), Australian author of crime fiction and children's literature
 John H. Disher (1921–1988), American aeronautical engineer and NASA manager
 Karen Disher (born 1972), American storyboard artist and film director
 Matt Disher (born 1976), Canadian lacrosse goaltender

Fictional character
 Randy Disher, fictional character on the television series Monk